The Laclede Station Ruin is a former way station on the Overland Trail in Sweetwater County, Wyoming, between the Big Pond Station and the Dug Springs Station. Constructed in the 1860s, the station was built of stone slabs.  The ruins of some of its walls remain. The site was placed on the National Register of Historic Places on December 6, 1978.

References

External links
 Laclede Station at the Wyoming State Historic Preservation Office

National Register of Historic Places in Sweetwater County, Wyoming
Overland Trail